The Sharon Cuneta Show (also known as "Sharon" and "TSCS") was a Philippine musical variety show hosted by the Philippines' megastar Sharon Cuneta. It aired on Sunday night from September 14, 1986, to June 15, 1997.

Broadcast History
The two-hour musical spectacle produced by Viva Television initially aired on IBC from September 14, 1986, to February 28, 1988. After its two-year run on IBC, the top-rated show moved to ABS-CBN where it became a Sunday night staple from March 6, 1988, to June 15, 1997. The show ran for eleven years on Philippine television.
Clips from the IBC's run of the show was shown on IBC's archival program Retro TV in 2003.

The ABS-CBN-run episodes of the show were shown on Jeepney TV under the title The Best of The Sharon Cuneta Show in 2018.

Cast

Main host
 Sharon Cuneta

Co-hosts
 Joey de Leon (1986–1990)
 Jimmy Santos (1990–1994)
 Herbert Bautista (1990–1997)
 Randy Santiago (1994–1997)
 Manny Castaneda

Featuring
 Adrenalin Dancers
 VIP Dancers
 Megaband

Awards
 PMPC Star Awards for Television's Best Musical Variety Show (1993)
 PMPC Star Awards for Television's Best Female TV Host (1990, 1993–96)

See also
 List of shows previously aired by ABS-CBN
 List of programs previously broadcast by Intercontinental Broadcasting Corporation

References

External links
 The Sharon Cuneta Show on ABS-CBN.com on Internet Archive
 

ABS-CBN original programming
Intercontinental Broadcasting Corporation original programming
1986 Philippine television series debuts
1997 Philippine television series endings
Philippine variety television shows
1980s Philippine television series
1990s Philippine television series
Television series by Viva Television
Filipino-language television shows